{{DISPLAYTITLE:C25H42N7O17P3S}}
The molecular formula C25H42N7O17P3S (molar mass: 837.62 g/mol) may refer to:

 Butyryl-CoA
 Isobutyryl-CoA

Molecular formulas